Zhang Shuang may refer to:

 Zhang Shuang (speed skater) (born 1986), Chinese female speed skater
 Zhang Shuang (ice hockey) (born 1987), Chinese female ice hockey player

See also
 Zheng Shuang (disambiguation)